This is a list of settlements in Somerset by population based on the results of the 2011 census. The next United Kingdom census will take place in 2021. In 2011, there were 28 built-up area subdivisions with 5,000 or more inhabitants in Somerset, shown in the table below.

This is not a list of parishes or their populations, but of settlements as defined by the ONS.

Population ranking

See also 

 Somerset

References 

Somerset
Somerset-related lists
Somerset, Settlements
Somerset